Sven Jonasson (9 July 1909 – 17 September 1984) was a Swedish football striker and manager.

Career
He played for Sweden at the 1936 Summer Olympics. He was born in Borås and died in Varberg.

He played for IF Elfsborg and the Sweden national football team, for whom he appeared in the 1934 and 1938 World Cups. He scored two goals in 1934 and one in 1938. Jonasson holds the record for most goals (252 goals) and most consecutive games (344 games, 1927–1941) in Allsvenskan (top level of Swedish football).
In 1936 he is mentioned in a Danish source for playing as a "false 9" when playing against a team using a WM-formation. In the same article the Danish journalist compares Sven Jonasson to the English centreforward Ted Drake.

Honours

Player
Elfsborg
Allsvenskan: 1935–36, 1938–39, 1939–40

References

External links

1909 births
1984 deaths
Swedish footballers
Sweden international footballers
1934 FIFA World Cup players
1938 FIFA World Cup players
Olympic footballers of Sweden
Footballers at the 1936 Summer Olympics
IF Elfsborg players
Allsvenskan players
Swedish football managers
IF Elfsborg managers
Association football forwards
People from Borås
Sportspeople from Västra Götaland County